What is called thinking? is a book by the philosopher Martin Heidegger, the published version of a lecture course he gave during the winter and summer semesters of 1951 and 1952 at the University of Freiburg.

Reception
The philosopher Hannah Arendt wrote that "For an acquaintance with the thought of Heidegger, What Is Called Thinking? is as important as Being and Time.

References

1952 speeches
1954 non-fiction books
Books by Martin Heidegger
German non-fiction books
Metaphysics books
Philosophy lectures